Jacek Robert Bąk (born 7 June 1962) is a Polish former footballer who played as a midfielder and forward. He had success as a player with Lech Poznań and Legia Warsaw, and also had a notable spell with Lechia Gdańsk.

Career

Early years

Being born in the village of Roźwienica, Bąk started playing football in the nearby town of Jarosław playing for the JKS 1909 Jarosław youth team. In 1980 he joined the biggest team in the region, Resovia Rzeszów, playing 42 times over the next two seasons.

Lech Poznań

In 1982 he joined Lech Poznań, where he spent the next three seasons. He played a total of 84 league games scoring 4 goals. During his time with Lech Bąk won the I liga in 1982–83 and 1983–84, and the Polish Cup in 1984.

Lechia Gdańsk

Bąk joined Lechia Gdańsk in 1985. He made his Lechia debut against his former club Lech on 31 July 1985 in a 0-0 draw. He spent 3 seasons with Lechia, playing 62 times in the top division for Lechia. During his time at Lechia the team were often towards the lower end of the table. He left during the winter of the 1987-88 season when Lechia looked on the verge of relegation to the II liga. After Lechia he spent 6 months with Zawisza Bydgoszcz.

Legia Warsaw

Bąk moved to Legia Warsaw in 1988, making his debut against Olimpia Poznań. His time with Legia was as successful as his time with Lech. During his 132 appearances for the club, Bąk helped Legia to win the Polish Cup in 1988 and 1989, as well as the Polish SuperCup in 1988. His final appearance for Legia game in November 1992, with Bąk leaving Legia during the summer of 1993.

Later years

Bąk spent his later footballing years playing with Casale F.B.C., Chatillon St. Vincent and Crescentinese CC in Italy between 1994-1997. He returned to Poland in 1997 to play with Olimpia Warsaw until 1998. After 3 years away from the game he played with Marymont Warsaw in 2001.

Honours
Lech Poznań
Ekstraklasa: 1982–83, 1983–84
Polish Cup: 1984

Legia Warsaw
Polish Cup: 1988, 1989
Polish SuperCup: 1988

References

1962 births
JKS 1909 Jarosław players
Lech Poznań players
Lechia Gdańsk players
Legia Warsaw players
Polish footballers
Association football midfielders
Association football forwards
Living people
Polish expatriate footballers
Expatriate footballers in Italy
People from Jarosław County